Pachydota albiceps is a moth of the family Erebidae. It was described by Francis Walker in 1856. It is found in Costa Rica, Panama, Venezuela, Suriname, Brazil, Guyana, French Guiana, Guadeloupe, St. Kitts, St. Lucia and Martinique.

References

Phaegopterina
Moths described in 1856